Darryl Neighbour (born July 21, 1948) is a Canadian wheelchair curler. He was the third on the team that won gold at the 2009 World Championships and was selected as third for Team Canada in the 2010 Winter Paralympics. He has been paraplegic since 2000.

Results

References

External links

Profile at the Official Website for the 2010 Winter Paralympics in Vancouver

Paralympic wheelchair curlers of Canada
1948 births
Living people
Curlers from British Columbia
Canadian wheelchair curlers
Wheelchair curlers at the 2010 Winter Paralympics
Medalists at the 2010 Winter Paralympics
Paralympic gold medalists for Canada
Canadian male curlers
World wheelchair curling champions
Canadian wheelchair curling champions
Paralympic medalists in wheelchair curling